Maria Navarro Skaranger (born 1994) is a Norwegian writer.

Biography
Skaranger was born in Oslo and studied at the Academy of Creative Writing in Hordaland and at the University of Oslo.

Books
She has published two books:
All the Foreigners Have Closed Curtains (2015), which won the First Novel Prize and has been made into a film
Book of Grief (The Story of Nils in the Woods) which won the Oslo Prize and the EU Prize for Literature

References

1994 births
Living people
Norwegian people of Chilean descent
Writers from Oslo
Norwegian novelists